LaVerne Nelson Black (1887-1939) was an American painter whose work depicted Native Americans. Born in Wisconsin, he lived in Taos, New Mexico in the 1920s and Phoenix, Arizona in the 1930s, where he did two murals for the NRHP-listed United States Post Office. His work is in the permanent collections of the Denver Art Museum, the Fred Jones Jr. Museum of Art, and the Smithsonian American Art Museum.

References

1887 births
1939 deaths
American male painters
19th-century American painters
20th-century American painters
19th-century American male artists
20th-century American male artists
Section of Painting and Sculpture artists